The Walking Dead: The Fall of the Governor is a two-part post-apocalyptic horror novel written by Robert Kirkman and Jay Bonansinga. Part one was released on October 8, 2013 and part two was released March 4, 2014. The novel is a spin-off of Kirkman's series of graphic novels and explores the back-story of one of the series' most infamous characters, The Governor. The Fall of the Governor is the third and final book in a trilogy of novels, following The Walking Dead: Rise of the Governor and The Walking Dead: The Road to Woodbury.

Plot

Part one
Along with a few other Woodbury survivors Lilly Caul and Caesar Martinez are on a supply run. During the run Lilly is attracted to a fellow survivor, Austin Ballard. They gather supplies from a warehouse but their supply run is interrupted by attacking zombies. Luckily they manage to escape unharmed. On their way back to Woodbury they see a crashing helicopter and decide to investigate. The pilot is already dead when they find the helicopter, but a passenger named Christina has survived. They make it back to Woodbury where Christina is treated by Dr. Stevens who warns her not to trust the Governor. When the Governor arrives he asks her who she is. Christina refuses to answer his questions and he threatens her. Finally she decides to tell the truth. She used to be a journalist in Atlanta and she was holed up in a TV station along with some other survivors. When the supplies ran low people turned on each other and Christina and the pilot, a cameraman named Mike, escaped using the chopper. Before they left the station a fellow survivor tampered with the engine, causing it to crash. She confronts the Governor and he chokes her to death. The Governor and his henchmen Gabe and Bruce visit Dr. Stevens and threaten him. His safety is only guaranteed at the moment because he is the only doctor, but he can be replaced easily if another doctor arrives.

After leaving Stevens, they notice Martinez who informs them about three new arrivals (who are revealed to be Rick, Glenn and Michonne). The Governor decides to give them a tour. Meanwhile, Lilly is trying to teach Austin to survive and the two fall in love. Austin gets injured during training and they rush to the infirmary, where they notice an injured Governor. The Governor tells them the new arrivals attacked him and he had to chop off the leader's (Rick's) hand. While Rick is at the infirmary, Glenn and Michonne are locked up in two storage rooms. The Governor rapes and beats up Michonne regularly. When her relationship with Austin becomes more serious Lilly discovers she is pregnant and Austin is the father.

One day an arena fighter named Harold Abernathy is killed by a vengeful opponent named Eugene Cooney. Because the Governor has a show planned later that day he forces Michonne to fight Eugene in the arena. During the fight Michonne decapitates Eugene using her katana, which upsets the audience. The Governor discovers that Rick, Glenn and Michonne live in a prison and he wants to find out where the prison is. He enlists Martinez to gain Rick's trust and help them escape, so he can find the prison.

Martinez succeeds to convince Rick that they are on the same side. He helps him escape and frees Glenn and Michonne. When they flee Dr. Stevens and his assistant Alice join them. Outside Woodbury Stevens is bitten and killed by a zombie. Meanwhile, Michonne goes back to The Governor's apartment for revenge. She knocks him out and ties him up. She proceeds to torture him by mutilating his penis, cutting off his right arm and removing his left eye using a spoon. Then she leaves him for dead and escapes. The first part ends when Gabe and Bruce find the Governor and Austin and Lilly, not knowing what happened to the Governor, finally feel safe and optimistic under the Governor's rule.

Part two
With Dr. Stevens gone Bob Stookey has to treat the Governor's injuries and keeps him in a coma. Outside Woodbury Lilly discovers Dr. Stevens, who has turned into a walker and kills him. Back inside Lilly notices the Governor's absence and talks to Gabe. He brings her to the Governor, who is still in a coma. Along with some other Woodbury residents she manages to keep Woodbury running. After the Governor wakes up he speaks to her. He tells her that Martinez' escape was part of a plan to discover the prison's location. Because Martinez has been gone for a week, the Governor asks Lilly to find him.

She organises a search party and they find Martinez, who was killed and has turned into a walker. They cut off his head and bring it to the Governor as proof. Later that night The Governor makes his first public appearance in Woodbury after his attack. He shows the people of Woodbury Martinez' head and tells them that Rick's group killed Martinez and Dr. Stevens. He tells them that they should strike first to protect themselves. During his speech Lilly notices the Governor is lying and starts to doubt his leadership. Shortly afterwards Lilly's stress causes a miscarriage.

A group of Woodbury residents led by Bruce are on a supply run to a nearby National Guard station searching for weapons, but they encounter several members of Rick's group. Rick's people kill all of them, except for Bruce, who is barely alive. When the Governor arrives he shoots Bruce in the head to prevent reanimation and tells his people to follow the tracks to find the prison. They find the prison, but the Governor orders them not to attack yet. They have to wait until the guard of the prison group is down.

After a few weeks the Governor and a group of Woodbury soldiers march towards the prison. Among the vehicles is a tank. They attack first, but the prison group fends off the attack and a lot of Woodbury soldiers are killed. After they retreat they are attacked by two prison group residents: Michonne and Tyreese. While Michonne manages to escape, Tyreese is captured and Michonne's katana is confiscated. The next morning the Governor goes to the prison gate and tells Rick to leave the prison. Otherwise he will kill Tyreese. The prison group do not respond and the Governor decapitates Tyreese using Michonne's katana. Back at camp the Governor tells the Woodbury soldiers that the prison people killed their own man so the Governor could not use him to take over the prison.

Michonne returns and attacks again. While failing to kill the Governor she steals her sword back. The Woodbury soldiers attack again, but are repelled by grenades. Gabe is killed by a prison resident, who attacks them from outside. The Governor uses his tank to destroy the prison fences and the Woodbury soldiers invade the prison, searching for survivors to kill. They see three people trying to flee and kill two of them, while the third one surrenders. Then another group of survivors, led by Rick tries to escape and Alice is with them. Alice is shot in the leg and the Governor shoots her in the head. The Governor sees Rick Grimes and his family fleeing the prison and orders Lilly to shoot them down. Lilly shoots and kills one of the remaining survivors. She then quickly realizes that the woman was carrying a baby, who was also struck by the bullet and subsequently crushed when the woman fell. The Governor kills the man who surrendered. Lilly realizes what kind of monster the Governor is and starts arguing with the Governor. Meanwhile, a group of walkers, attracted by the gunfire, invade the prison.

Lilly shoots the Governor in the head, which distracts the walkers temporarily. The remaining Woodbury soldiers flee into the prison. Austin reveals that he has been bitten by a walker and distracts the walkers so the rest of the survivors can flee the prison, but he is killed. Upon returning to Woodbury Lilly becomes the new leader. She kills Penny, the Governor's zombified niece and all the walker heads the Governor kept in fish tanks. The novel ends when a group of new survivors, looking for shelter, arrives.

References

2013 American novels
Fall of the Governor
Thomas Dunne Books books